This is a list of species in the genus Epuraea.

Epuraea species

 Epuraea adumbrata (Mannerheim, 1852)
 Epuraea aestiva (Linnaeus, 1758)
 Epuraea alternans Grouvelle, 1912
 Epuraea alternata Parsons, 1969
 Epuraea ambigua Mannerheim, 1843
 Epuraea avara (Randall, 1838)
 Epuraea boreella (Zetterstedt, 1828)
 Epuraea californica (Gillogly, 1946)
 Epuraea corticina Erichson, 1843
 Epuraea depressa (Illiger, 1798)
 Epuraea erichsoni Reitter, 1873
 Epuraea eximia Parsons, 1969
 Epuraea flavomaculata Mäklin, 1853
 Epuraea fulvescens Horn, 1879
 Epuraea helvola Erichson, 1843
 Epuraea horni Crotch, 1874
 Epuraea integra Horn, 1879
 Epuraea labilis Erichson, 1843
 Epuraea lengi Parsons, 1969
 Epuraea linearis Mäklin, 1853
 Epuraea luteola Erichson, 1843  (pineapple sap beetle)
 Epuraea macrophthalma Reitter, 1873
 Epuraea monogama (Crotch, 1874)
 Epuraea munda (Sharp, 1878)
 Epuraea nearctica 
 Epuraea obliquus Hatch, 1962
 Epuraea obtusicollis Reitter, 1873
 Epuraea ocularis Fairmaire, 1849
 Epuraea pallescens (Stephens, 1830)
 Epuraea papagona Casey, 1884
 Epuraea parsonsi Connell, 1981
 Epuraea peltoides Horn, 1879
 Epuraea planulata Erichson, 1843
 Epuraea populi Dodge, 1939
 Epuraea quadricollis 
 Epuraea rectangula Connell, 1981
 Epuraea rufa (Say, 1825)
 Epuraea rufida (Melsheimer, 1846)
 Epuraea rufomarginata (Stephens, 1830)
 Epuraea scaphoides Horn, 1879
 Epuraea terminalis Mannerheim, 1843
 Epuraea truncatella Mannerheim, 1846
 Epuraea umbrosa Horn, 1879

References